Rage and Ruin is the fourteenth solo studio album by Jimmy Barnes, released through Liberation Music on 27 August 2010. It would be his last album of original material until 2019's My Criminal Record.

Review
Jon O'Brien from AllMusic said: "After tackling old-school R&B, country-roots, and Memphis soul on his previous three releases, Australian rock veteran Jimmy Barnes returns to more familiar territory on his 14th studio release, Rage and Ruin. Produced by longtime collaborator Don Gehman, the back-to-basics affair sees the gravelly-voiced rocker battle his demons on 12 tracks inspired by a book of notes he wrote while struggling with drug and alcohol addiction. It isn't exactly pretty, but for fans of vintage Australian pub rock, Rage and Ruin ticks all the boxes."

Track listing
CD/Digital download
 "God or Money" (Jimmy Barnes and Mike Daly) – 3:52
 "Before the Devil Knows You're Dead" (Barnes/Daly) – 4:11
 "Letter from a Dead Heart" (Barnes/Daly) – 4:25
 "Stupid Heart" (Barnes/Daly) – 3:54
 "Adam Was Just a Man" (Barnes/Mark Simos) – 4:18
 "I've Seen It All (Rage and Ruin)" (Barnes/Simos) – 5:25
 "Can't Do It Again" (Barnes/Simos) – 4:28
 "Time Can Change" (Barnes/Daly) – 3:58
 "This Ain't the Day That I Die" (Barnes/Daly) – 3:22
 "Love Can Break the Hardest Heart" (Barnes/Simos) – 4:12
 "Turn It Around" (Barnes/Daly) – 3:19
 "Largs Pier Hotel" (Barnes/Simos) – 4:48

Deluxe edition bonus tracks
 "Navigator"
 "Taking Time"
 "One More Night"
 "Let It Go"

Charts

Weekly charts

Year-end charts

Certifications

Singles
"Before the Devil Knows You're Dead"
"God or Money"

References

Jimmy Barnes albums
2010 albums